Iain Denholm (born 14 February 1948) was a Scottish amateur football forward who played in the Scottish League for Queen's Park. He was capped by Scotland at amateur level.

References

Scottish footballers
Scottish Football League players
Queen's Park F.C. players
Association football forwards
Scotland amateur international footballers
Living people
1948 births
Footballers from Glasgow